David Shimoni (Hebrew: דוד שמעוני) (25 August 1891 – 10 December 1956) was an Israeli poet, writer and translator.

Shimonovitch (later David Shimoni) was born in Babruysk in Belarus (then part of the Russian Empire) to Nissim Shimonovitch and Malka Fridland Although he lived in Ottoman Palestine for a year in 1909, he did not immigrate to British-administered Palestine until 1920.  He was an early member of Al-Domi.

Awards and commemoration

 In 1936 and 1949, Shimoni was awarded the Bialik Prize for Literature.
 In 1954, he was awarded the Israel Prize, for literature.
 He is also a recipient of the Tchernichovsky Prize for exemplary translation.

Shimoni Street in Jerusalem is named after him, as is Shimoni Street in Beersheva, Israel.

See also
 List of Bialik Prize recipients
 List of Israel Prize recipients

References

1891 births
1956 deaths
Emigrants from the Russian Empire to the Ottoman Empire
Jews from the Russian Empire
Israel Prize in literature recipients
Israeli Jews
Israeli people of Belarusian-Jewish descent
Israeli poets
Israeli translators
Jews in Mandatory Palestine
People from Babruysk
20th-century translators
20th-century poets
Burials at Trumpeldor Cemetery